Kobe Prentice (born March 10, 2004) is an American football wide receiver for the Alabama Crimson Tide.

Early years
Prentice attended Calera High School in Calera, Alabama. As a senior, he had 1,229 receiving yards and 19 touchdowns. He originally committed to the University of Maryland, College Park to play college football, but changed to the University of Alabama.

College career
Prentice was named a starter his true freshman year at Alabama in 2022. In his first career game, he had five receptions for 60 yards.

References

External links
Crimson Tide bio

Living people
Players of American football from Alabama
American football wide receivers
Alabama Crimson Tide football players
2004 births